Zarodikha is a rural locality (a village) in Azletskoye Rural Settlement, Kharovsky District, Vologda Oblast, Russia. The population was 6 as of 2002.

Geography 
Zarodikha is located 49 km northwest of Kharovsk (the district's administrative centre) by road. Krasimikha is the nearest rural locality.

References 

Rural localities in Kharovsky District